A municipality is an administrative unit of local government similar to a city. They were established and decided after the creation of the Local Government Ministry of the Palestinian National Authority in 1994. All municipalities are assigned by the Local Government Ministry. Municipal council members and mayors are elected by the residents of the particular locality. Municipalities are divided into four sectors depending on their population and importance to their particular governorate.

Municipal types

See also 
List of cities administered by the Palestinian Authority (38)
Palestinian refugee camps

External links

The Crisis of Local Government Institution in Palestine, a case study Abdulnasser Makky. Arabic Media Internet Network. 2004-11-22.

 
 
Subdivisions of the State of Palestine